Horton David Haight (June 20, 1832 – January 19, 1900) was a Mormon pioneer.  He first came to Utah at age 14 in 1847 as a member of Daniel Spencer's immigrant company.  He was in charge of a freight company that came to Utah Territory in 1859 and led four "down-and-back" companies in the 1860s.  These "down-and-back" companies sent wagons and teams from Utah, and brought back new emigrants, their baggage, and their freight on the return trip.

Life and career
Haight was born in Moravia, Cayuga County, New York.  He was the son of Hector Caleb Haight and his wife, Julia Ann (née Van Orden).  The family moved to Illinois in 1837 and joined the Church of Jesus Christ of Latter-day Saints (LDS Church) in 1845, moving to Nauvoo.  He was in the company sent to aid the Latter-day Saints on the trail in coming into Salt Lake City in 1848.  In 1857, he served with Lot Smith in delaying the approach of Johnston's Army.

Haight lived for many years in Farmington, Utah. His wife Louise (née Leavitt) Haight was a counselor to Aurelia Spencer Rogers in the first Primary, which was organized in Farmington.  Louise Haight also came from a family who had ties to the LDS church. Her father was Weare Leavitt, born at Grantham, New Hampshire, and his wife Phoebe (née Cowles) Leavitt of Claremont, New Hampshire.

Haight served as Davis County sheriff and in the Utah territorial legislature in 1861.

In 1882, he was sent to Oakley, Idaho by John Taylor, the president of the LDS Church.  Haight served there as a bishop until 1887 and then became president of the newly formed Cassia Stake.  He served as stake president until his death in 1900.  Haight also served as a county commissioner in Cassia County, Idaho.

One of Haight's grandsons was David B. Haight, who became an apostle in the LDS Church.

References

Andrew Jenson. Latter-day Saint Biographical Encyclopedia, vol. 1, p. 302
C. Terry Warner, “Elder David B. Haight,” Ensign, October 1976, p. 5
H. Dean Garrett, “The Honeymoon Trail,” Ensign, July 1989, p. 23

External links
Search page for the "Mormon Pioneer Overland Travel" database - searching here will list pioneer companies in which Haight was involved

1832 births
1900 deaths
Utah sheriffs
American leaders of the Church of Jesus Christ of Latter-day Saints
County commissioners in Idaho
Members of the Utah Territorial Legislature
19th-century American politicians
Mormon pioneers
People from Oakley, Idaho
People from Moravia, New York
People from Farmington, Utah
People from Hancock County, Illinois
Latter Day Saints from Idaho
Latter Day Saints from New York (state)
Latter Day Saints from Illinois
Latter Day Saints from Utah